The 1973–74 Divizia C was the 18th season of Liga III, the third tier of the Romanian football league system.

Team changes

To Divizia C
Relegated from Divizia B
 —

Promoted from County Championship

 Metalul Rădăuți 
 Constructorul Iași
 Constructorul Botoșani
 Victoria PTTR Botoșani
 Energia Gheorghiu-Dej
 Hușana Huși
 Constructorul Vaslui
 Bradul Roznov
 Foresta Gugești
 Luceafărul Focșani
 Avântul Măneciu
 Portul Brăila
 Carpați Nehoiu
 Rapid Fetești
 Tehnometal Galați
 Voința Constanța
 Constructorul Tulcea
 Arrubium Măcin
 Triumf București
 IOR București
 Dinamo Slobozia
 Argeșul Mihăilești
 Vulturii Câmpulung
 Cetatea Turnu Măgurele
 Cimentul Fieni
 Aro Câmpulung

 FOB Balș
 Metalurgistul Sadu
 CFR Craiova
 Progresul Strehaia
 CIL Drobeta Turnu Severin
 Petrolul Țicleni
 Dacia Orăștie
 Unirea Sânnicolau Mare
 CFR Caransebeș
 Cimentul Turda
 Constructorul Alba Iulia
 Crișana Sebiș
 Oașul Negrești
 Minerul Șuncuiuș
 Victoria Zalău
 Măgura Șimleu Silvaniei
 Unirea Sfântu Gheorghe
 Miercurea Ciuc
 Avântul Reghin
 Minerul Rodna
 Hebe Sângeorz-Băi
 Precizia Săcele
 Hidroenergia Râmnicu Vâlcea
 Carpați Mârșa

From Divizia C
Promoted to Divizia B
 CSM Suceava
 Viitorul Vaslui
 Caraimanul Bușteni
 Constructorul Galați
 Celuloza Călărași
 Flacăra Moreni
 Minerul Motru
 Mureșul Deva
 Arieșul Turda
 Victoria Carei
 Gaz Metan Mediaș
 Tractorul Brașov
 Victoria Roman
 Petrolul Moinești
 Metalul Mija
 Oțelul Galați
 Autobuzul București
 Oltul Slatina
 Vulturii Textila Lugoj
 UM Timișoara
 IS Câmpia Turzii
 Minerul Cavnic
 Textila Odorheiu Secuiesc
 Carpați Brașov

Relegated to County Championship
 —

Renamed teams
Textila Botoșani was renamed as CS Botoșani.

Străduința Suceava was renamed as Sportul Muncitoresc Suceava.

Minobrad Vatra Dornei was renamed as Dorna Vatra Dornei.

CFR Roșiori was renamed as Rova Roșiori.

Minerul Rovinari was renamed as Energia Rovinari.

Pandurii Târgu Jiu and Cimentul Târgu Jiu merged, the first one absorbed the second one and was renamed as Cimentul Târgu Jiu.

Independența Cisnădie was renamed as Textila Cisnădie.

Hidroenergia Râmnicu Vâlcea was renamed as Chimistul Râmnicu Vâlcea.

Minerul Bocșa Montană merged with Metalul Bocșa to formed AS Bocșa

Other changes
 Unirea Tricolor Bârlad retired before the start of the competition.

 CFR Arad and Vagonul Arad merged, the new entity was named Unirea Arad and took the place of first one in Divizia B.
 
 Strungul Arad took the place of Vagonul Arad in Divizia C due to the merge between CFR Arad and Vagonul Arad.

 Minerul Băița took the place of Constructorul Baia Mare in Divizia C.

League tables

Seria I

Seria II

Seria III

Seria IV

Seria V

Seria VI

Seria VII

Seria VIII

Seria IX

Seria X

Seria XI

Seria XII

See also 
 1973–74 Divizia A
 1973–74 Divizia B

References 

Liga III seasons
3
Romania